Phyllonorycter conformis is a moth of the family Gracillariidae. It is known from Himachal Pradesh, India and from Nepal.

References

conformis
Moths of Asia
Moths described in 1910